Artyom Pugolovkin (born 26 January 1992) is a Russian ice hockey player. He is currently playing with KHL Medvescak of the Kontinental Hockey League (|KHL).

Pugolovkin made his Kontinental Hockey League (KHL) debut playing with HC Spartak Moscow during the 2012–13 KHL season.

References

External links

1992 births
Living people
HC Spartak Moscow players
Russian ice hockey forwards
Ice hockey people from Moscow